Dutta, also spelled Dutt or Datta, is a Hindu family name found primarily among Bengali Kayasthas, and also among Suvarna Baniks, Gandhabaniks in Bengal. The name is also found among certain North Indian and Pakistani Brahmin communities garol means "given" or "granted" in Sanskrit and is also an alternative name for the Hindu deity Dattatreya.

Bengal 
According to Indian historian Tej Ram Sharma, in Bengal the surname Dutta/Datta (দত্ত) is used by Kayastha caste. The office of Kayastha (scribe) was instituted before the Gupta period (c.320 to 550 CE). Originally, Kayastha was composed of people from different Varnas, including Brahmins and Kshatriyas. After the Gupta reign, the Kayasthas in Bengal developed into a caste, and gained a higher status, incorporating the Pala, Sena and Varman Kings and their descendants. In the middle period of the history of Bengal, between 1500 and 1850 CE, the Kayasthas were regarded as one of the highest of Hindu castes in the region.

Punjab 
Punjabi Dutt's belong to the Mohyal Brahmin community. According to the gotra system, Mohyal Dutt's are the descendants of Rishi Bharadwaj. Some consider Gaj Bhavan, the grandson of Rishi Bharadwaj to be the real founder of their clan.

Other Regions 

"Dutt" is also used as a titular surname or middle name in other North Indian states particularly by Brahmins. For instance, Indian wrestler Yogeshwar Dutt is a Brahmin from Haryana and former politician, Narayan Dutt Tiwari was a Kumaoni Brahmin from Uttarakhand.

Notable people 

 Aishwarya Dutta (Born 1995) Tamil Actress
 Akshay Kumar Datta (1820–1886); writer
 Anandita Dutta Tamuly, record holder in Limca Book of Records
 Aloke Dutta; tabla player
 Amal Dutta; Indian footballer (retired) and football coach.
 Anik Dutta; Bengali film director
 Anjan Dutt; Bengali singer, film director and actor
 Aroti Dutt; noted social worker
 Arpita Singh; born Arpita Dutta, Padma Bhushan awarded Painter
 Aswini Kumar Dutta (1856–1923); nationalist leader and philanthropist
 Bhabatosh Datta (1911–1997), Indian economist and academic, Padma Vibhushan (1990)
 Bhaktivinoda Thakur (Kedarnath Datta) (1838–1914); Magistrate and Vaishnava religious reformer
 Birendra Nath Datta, writer and a Padma Shri award recipient
 Bhupendranath Datta, Indian revolutionary and later a sociologist.
 Chitra Singh; born Chitra Shome, singer and wife of Jagjit Singh.
 Dhirendranath Datta (1886–1971); Bengali lawyer and politician
 Divya Dutta (born 1977); Hindi and Punjabi film actress.
 Durjoy Datta ; writer
 Gurusaday Dutt founder- Bratachari Movement,
 Himangshu Dutta (1908–1944); music composer
 Indrani Dutta, Bengali television actress
 Jyotirmoy Datta; writer, journalist, poet and essayist
 J. P. Dutta (born 1949), Indian film producer, writer and director
 Jyoti Prakash Dutta (writer), Bangladeshi short-story writer
 Kalpana Joshi; born Kalpana Dutt, noted freedom fighter
 Kanailal Dutta; freedom fighter
 Lara Dutta; Bollywood Actress
 Mankumari Basu; born Mankumari Dutt, poet and short story writer
 Monikangana Dutta, model and actress from Assam
 Munmun Dutta, Actress
 Michael Madhusudan Dutt (1824–1873); poet and dramatist
 Nargis (1 June 1929 – 3 May 1981); Actress
 Phulrenu Guha; born Phulrenu Dutta, politician and social activist.
 Radha Raman Dutta; music composer
 Rajani Palme Dutt, British politician
 Roby Datta, poet and educator
 Rasamay Dutt, Bengali educationist, first Indian puisne judge of India, first Indian member of the Asiatic Society.
 Romesh Chunder Dutt (1848–1909); writer, economist, historian, translator of Vedas
 Samadarshi Dutta; Bengali film actor
 Sanjay Dutt; actor
 Saroj Nalini Dutt (née De); noted social worker
 Satyendranath Dutta: (1882–1922) Bengali poet.
 Shanta Dutta; Indian microbiologist
 Sunil Dutt (1929–2005); actor, politician
 Sudhindranath Dutta, Bengali poet, essayist
 Supriyo Datta, nanotechnology researcher
 Swami Gambhirananda born Jatindranath Datta, Hindu religious teacher.
 Tanushree Dutta; Indian actress
 Tina Dutta; (actress)
 Toru Dutt (1856–1877); poet
 Utpal Dutt (1929–1993); author, dramatist, director, actor and activist
 Swami Vivekananda (1863–1902); born Narendranath Datta, spiritual leader of modern India
 Ullaskar Dutta; Indian revolutionary
 Yogeshwar Dutt; Wrestler

In popular culture 
In 2012, a Bengali film Dutta vs Dutta was released, directed by Anjan Dutt, the film captured family drama of three generations of a Bengali Dutta family.

References

Sources 

 
 
 
 
 
 
 

Indian surnames
Bengali Hindu surnames
Bengali-language surnames
Assamese-language surnames